Solactive is a German provider of financial indices based in Frankfurt. The company develops, calculates, and markets cost-efficient indices over several asset classes, including equity, fixed-income, and commodity indices. Solactive also engages in the development and branding of complex strategies, which are not based on traditional underlyings such as stocks and bonds, but instruments like funds, life insurance products, or basket of currencies.

Since its inception in 2007, Solactive has enjoyed fast growth. In 2010, there were 25 ETFs linked to indices calculated by Solactive, which reached more than 450 ETFs in October 2019. To date, Solactive calculates over 11.000 indices, which are used not only for ETFs but also as underlyings for structured products or as benchmarks for active funds.

With its headquarter in Frankfurt, Solactive also has further German offices in Berlin and Dresden. In 2017, the first overseas office was established in Toronto, followed by an establishment of an office in Hong Kong in 2018, ensuring coverage of all time zones for the company’s global client base.

Solactive has adopted a forward-looking approach to index development seeking to capitalize on market movements and trends to constantly bring new index ideas to the market and has put in place an efficient indexing infrastructure guaranteeing fast and flexible services to its clients.

Managed by Steffen Scheuble (CEO), Timo Pfeiffer (CMO), Alexander Steiner (CIO), and Felix Kanz (CTO), Solactive is organized in two business units Index Management and Product Development.

Products
Solactive offers two approaches to index development. On the one hand, the company creates Solactive branded indices, such as the Solactive Smart City Index or the Solactive eGaming Index.

On the other hand, Solactive offers white-label index calculation services. There, Solactive calculates indices, which are then marketed and distributed by the customer under its brand name. Examples include indices such as the BNP Paribas Global Agribusiness Total Return Index or the J.P. Morgan ERP Dividend Yield Long Index. This service includes the index calculation and administration. Solactive achieved its registration as a Benchmark Administrator with the BaFin in 2019, which enables the administration of benchmarks under the Benchmark Regulation in Europe.

In addition to client-specific indices, Solactive is also offering broad benchmark indices in the equity and bond space, such as the Solactive US Broad Market Index. In May 2018, Solactive decided to expand its benchmark offering by introducing its proprietary Global Benchmark Series (GBS) with a consistent approach to construct global stock market indices. The index family includes around 2,000 equity indices, covering developed and emerging markets based on the Solactive Country Classification Framework.

Solactive offers a broad range of customized indices ranging from traditional capitalization-weighted indices, including equity and fixed-income benchmarks, to thematic strategies and smart beta indices. Solactive is very engaged in offering its clients a wide number of alternative weighting schemes for its indices that are based on various criteria such as, among others, equal weighting, fundamental weighting, volatility features, and dividend yield weighting. Furthermore, Solactive shows high flexibility when it comes to incorporating features like optimizations, currency hedges, or other calculation parameters.

Indices are rules-based and offer investors exposure to different markets accounting for specific criteria. For instance, within the field of ESG (Environment, Social, Government) investing, fuelled by global efforts to reduce climate change, Solactive has launched, among others. the Solactive Green Bond Index and the Solactive ISS ESG Beyond Plastic Waste Index.

In addition to the traditional indexing business, Solactive also offers a range of services to ETF issuers, including the calculation of the iNAV or IOPV and the production of a PCF (Portfolio Composition File).

Solactive is working with over 450 international clients. Clients are for example financial institutions, such as ETF providers and investment banks. Examples:

  Banco Bilbao Vizcaya Argentaria
  BNP Paribas
  Deutsche Bank
  Amundi
  Global X Funds
  Societe Generale
  Van Eck Global
  Royal Bank of Canada
  Royal Bank of Scotland
  UBS
  JPMorgan Chase
  Morgan Stanley 
  UniCredit
  Credit Suisse 
  Commerzbank
  Goldman Sachs

History
 In October 2007, the company was created under the name Structured Solutions
 In June 2008, BNP launched an ETF based on an index calculated by the company
 In August 2010, 25 ETFs with over USD 5 billion are linked to indices calculated by Solactive
 In October 2011, launch of the first ETF linked to a bond index calculated by Solactive 
 In May 2012, release of the Solactive Guru Index, used for a Global X ETF 
 In July 2013, the company was rebranded as Solactive
 In March 2014, launch of the Solactive Green Bond Index
 In December 2014, Solactive had 170 exchanged traded funds, with over USD 25 billion linked to indices it calculates 
 In December 2015, 200 ETFs were linked to indices calculated by Solactive 
 In January 2016, Solactive enters the ESG benchmark business 
 In March 2016, Solactive ranked third in the US in terms of ETFs tied to its calculated indices
 In December 2016 Solactive enters the ESG benchmark business
 In January 2017, 250 ETFs globally linked to indices calculated by Solactive
 In July 2017, opening of Solactive Americas, the first overseas branch office located in Toronto
 In January 2018, more than 350 ETFs linked to indices calculated by Solactive
 In October 2018, Solactive established its second international business entity, located in Hong Kong
In April 2019, Solactive achieved registration as benchmark administrator under the European Benchmarks Regulation (BMR) with the German Federal Financial Supervisory Authority (BaFin)
In May 2019, Solactive announced that it has made a strategic investment in Minerva Analytics Ltd, the ESG research firm and proxy voting agency
 In October 2019, more than 450 ETFs linked to indices calculated by Solactive

See also
 Stock market index
 Exchange-traded fund
 Structured products

References

External links
 Official website
 Official Youtube Page

Financial services companies of Germany
Companies based in Frankfurt